Domenica in is an Italian Sunday long-running television show broadcast by Rai 1 since 1976. During its history, the title was also spelled as Domenica in... and Dom&Nica in.

The show was originally planned to offer to the Italian audience, affected in those years by a profound austerity, an alternative to the typical Sunday afternoon trips and outings.   It has been the first Italian program to go well beyond the standard duration of 2 hours and to have a very long running, about six hours from 2:00 p.m. to 8:00 p.m.   A program which is different in its structure from one edition to another, it consists of different segments reserved for entertainment, interviews, sport, games, journalism.

Editions

References

External links

1976 Italian television series debuts
Italian television shows
RAI original programming
1970s Italian television series
1980s Italian television series
1990s Italian television series
2000s Italian television series
2010s Italian television series